Marilla Township is a civil township of Manistee County in the U.S. state of Michigan. The population was 362 at the 2000 census.

Communities 
The first settler in the area of the township was C. Churchill from New York state, who arrived in June 1866. The township was organized in 1869, having previously been part of Brown Township. It was named after the sister of one of the original members of the township board of supervisors. A post office operated from October 1871 until June 1935. It was also a station on the Manistee and North-Eastern Railroad.
 Yates or Yates Corner was a rural post office in the northwest part of the township established in June 1884. The office was transferred and renamed Lemon Lake in April 1902. The office continued to operate until February 1904. Like Marilla, Lemon Lake was a station on the Manistee and North-Eastern Railroad.
 Brethren is an unincorporated community to the southwest in Dickson Township and the Brethren ZIP code 49619 serves a portion of southern Marilla Township.
 The village of Copemish is to the north in Cleon Township and the Copemish ZIP code 49625 serves most of the northern and eastern parts of Marilla Township.
 The village of Harrietta is to the southeast in Wexford County and the Harrietta ZIP code 49638 serves the southeast corner of Marilla Township.
 The village of Kaleva is to the west in Maple Grove Township and the Kaleva ZIP code 49645 serves the western portion of Marilla Township.

Geography

Demographics
As of the census of 2000, there were 362 people, 144 households, and 117 families residing in the township.  The population density was 10.2 per square mile (4.0/km2).  There were 222 housing units at an average density of 6.3 per square mile (2.4/km2).  The racial makeup of the township was 96.96% White, 1.38% Native American, 0.55% from other races, and 1.10% from two or more races. Hispanic or Latino of any race were 0.83% of the population.

There were 144 households, out of which 27.1% had children under the age of 18 living with them, 69.4% were married couples living together, 7.6% had a female householder with no husband present, and 18.8% were non-families. 13.9% of all households were made up of individuals, and 7.6% had someone living alone who was 65 years of age or older.  The average household size was 2.51 and the average family size was 2.75.

In the township the population was spread out, with 22.4% under the age of 18, 5.2% from 18 to 24, 22.9% from 25 to 44, 34.0% from 45 to 64, and 15.5% who were 65 years of age or older.  The median age was 45 years. For every 100 females, there were 100.0 males.  For every 100 females age 18 and over, there were 95.1 males.

The median income for a household in the township was $40,000, and the median income for a family was $40,341. Males had a median income of $34,375 versus $21,250 for females. The per capita income for the township was $17,643.  About 6.2% of families and 5.8% of the population were below the poverty line, including none of those under age 18 and 14.8% of those age 65 or over.

References

External links 
 

Townships in Manistee County, Michigan
Townships in Michigan